The year 1997 was the fifth year in the history of the Ultimate Fighting Championship (UFC), a mixed martial arts promotion based in the United States. In 1997, the UFC held five events beginning with UFC 12: Judgement Day.

Title fights

Debut UFC fighters
The following fighters fought their first UFC fight in 1997:

Alex Hunter
Brad Kohler
Carlos Barreto
Dan Bobish
Dmitri Stepanov
Donnie Chappell
Dwayne Cason
Enson Inoue
Eric Martin
Frank Shamrock
Greg Stott
Harry Moskowitz
Houston Dorr

Jackie Lee
Jim Mullen
Justin Martin
Yoshiki Takahashi
Kazushi Sakuraba
Kevin Jackson
Marcus Silveira
Mark Kerr
Maurice Smith
Nick Sanzo
Rainy Martinez
Randy Couture
Royce Alger

Saeed Hosseini
Steven Graham
Tito Ortiz
Tony Fryklund
Tony Halme
Tra Telligman
Vitor Belfort
Wallid Ismail
Wes Albritton
Conor Quinn
Yoji Anjo
Yuri Vaulin

Events list

See also
 UFC
 List of UFC champions
 List of UFC events

References

Ultimate Fighting Championship by year
1997 in mixed martial arts